Dang Guo was the one-party system adopted by the Republic of China under the Kuomintang, lasting from 1924 to 1987. It was adopted after Sun Yat-sen acknowledged the efficacy of the nascent Soviet Union's political system, including its system of dictatorship. Chiang Kai-shek later used the Kuomintang to control and operate the National Government of the Republic of China (ROC) and the National Revolutionary Army. All major national policies of the government bureaucracy were formulated by the Kuomintang, giving the party supreme power over the whole nation. Following the beliefs of Sun Yat-sen, political power should have been returned to the people after the National Revolutionary Army militarily ended the Warlord Era. However, martial law in the ROC continued from 1949 until 1987, during which other political parties were banned. Martial law was lifted in 1987 by President Chiang Ching-kuo, a move that legalized other political parties such as the Democratic Progressive Party and ended the Dang Guo.

Origin 
Dang Guo was short for Yi Dang Zhi Guo, which literally means "using the political party to run the state". In 1920, Sun Yat-sen, the Founding Father of the Republic of China, made Dang Guo the official ROC national policy during the phase of Military Rule and Political Tutelage (Two of the Three phases of the Fundamentals of National Reconstruction), having been influenced by Leninist ideology which led to the Russian Revolution. According to Sun Yat-sen, the Kuomintang should be paramount over the Republic of China in the course of revolution (war against the warlords), and Kuomintang should issue orders to the ROC bureaucracy, all the NGO groups, and indeed to any individual.

In 1924 Sun Yat-sen said:

During the Russian revolution, political dictatorship was used, everything else can be discarded, the only aim was the success of the revolution... its success was due to the party (Russian Communist Party (Bolsheviks)) being on top of the state. I suggest... we should reorganize by putting the party (Kuomintang) on top of the state (ROC).

Dang Guo in practice 

After Sun Yat-sen decided to follow and copy the Soviet Union political system, his successor Chiang Kai-shek used Kuomintang to control and to operate both the national government of the Republic of China and the National Revolutionary Army, which was sometimes called "The Party's Army", and equivalent to Mao Zedong's famous quote, "Political power grows out of the barrel of a gun". The ROC bureaucracy had then become the means and tools of Kuomintang, where all the major national policies were formulated, resulting in the party holding the supreme power of the whole nation.

The concept of Dang Guo was an outgrowth of Sun's concept of "political tutelage," during which the Kuomintang was to lead the state and instruct the people on how the democratic system was to work prior to the transition to full democracy.

Under Dang Guo, ROC military personnel and civil servants alike were expected to owe their allegiance to Kuomintang first and the State second – a policy reflected by such phrases as "Service to the Party and the Nation", and also on the national anthem, which makes an explicit reference to "Our Party". Likewise, the emblem of Kuomintang was used as the emblem of the State, and the flag of Kuomintang has been used as the naval jack to this day.

The Kuomintang unified China in 1927, and started to prepare the state for democracy, as according to Sun's teaching. The Constitution of the Republic of China enacted in 1947 stipulates that different parties shall enjoy equal status, and the National Revolutionary Army was returned to civilian control as the Army of the Republic of China. However, due to the outbreak of the Chinese Civil War, the ROC was under military rule of the KMT during the period of mobilization.

After martial law ended in 1987, all political parties became legal and the Republic of China was democratized. Since then, the President of the Republic of China has been democratically elected by the people of the Free Area. Chen Shui-bian of the Democratic Progressive Party was elected president, making him the first non-KMT president under the Constitution.

See also 
 Particracy
 Party-state capitalism
 Transitional Justice Commission
 Wild Strawberry student movement

References

Citations

Sources 

 
 张英洪：孙中山的以党治国思想  ( Google translation)
 孙中山“以党治国”思想的形成及其影响 
 吴敏：以党治国是国民党的遗毒  ( Google translation)
 浅议孙中山的民主宪政思想对当代中国民主政治与国家现代化的启示 作者：李昌庚  (Google translation)

Oligarchy
White Terror (Taiwan)
Ideology of the Kuomintang
Politics of the Republic of China (1912–1949)
Political history of Taiwan